Barpalaha is a village in Kamrup rural district, in the state of Assam, India, situated in north bank of the river Brahmaputra.

Transport
The village is near National Highway 15  and connected to nearby towns and cities like Rangiya, Baihata and Guwahati with regular buses and other modes of transportation.

See also
 Baruajani
 Batarhat

References

Villages in Kamrup district